Amandina is a given name. Notable people with the name include:

Amandina of Schakkebroek (1872–1900), Belgian Franciscan missionary sister in China
Amandina Lihamba (born 1944), Tanzanian academic, actress, playwright, and director

See also
Amandine (given name)